Gongzhuling is a county-level city under the administration of Changchun. It is located in central Jilin province of Northeast China, halfway between Siping and Changchun, along the main railway line in the Northeast. Major employers in the city include Jilin Academy of Agricultural Sciences, located on the north side of the railway and several factories which manufacture auto parts. There is major military presence in the area, including a PLA base and a military airport.

Administrative divisions

Subdistricts:
Dongsan Subdistrict, Tiebei Subdistrict, Lingdong Subdistrict, Henan Subdistrict, Hebei Subdistrict

Towns:
Fanjiatun, Xiangshui, Liufangzi, Heilinzi, Daling, Huaide, Shuangchengbao, Qinjiatun, Ershijiazi Manchu Ethnic Town, Sangshutai, Nanwaizi, Yangdachengzi, Bawu, Taojiatun, Bolichengzi, Chaoyangpo, Dayushu, Maochengzi, Shiwu

Townships:
Shuangyushu Township, Yulin Township, Baoquan Township, Shuanglong, Lianhuashan Township, Huanling Township, Weizigou Township, Liuyang Township, Yongfa Township, Sidaogang Township, Heqi Township, Fengxiang Township, Fangmagou Manchu Ethnic Township

Climate

Notable persons
 Wang Gongquan
 Li Hongzhi

References

External links

 
County-level divisions of Jilin
Cities in Jilin